Jaime Filipe Machado Poulson (born 22 June 1989) is a Portuguese footballer who plays for SC São João de Ver as a forward.

Club career
Born in Paredes, Porto District, Poulson was on the books of Boavista F.C. as a youth before starting his senior career in the lower leagues with S.C. Espinho and U.S.C. Paredes. In 2011, he signed for Varzim S.C. and won the third-division title in his only season before signing a three-year deal with F.C. Paços de Ferreira of the Primeira Liga on 3 July 2012.

Poulson spent the 2013–14 campaign on loan to C.D. Aves in the Segunda Liga. On 5 January 2014, he scored both goals as they won 2–1 at his parent club in the fifth round of the Taça de Portugal. He rescinded his contract with Paços on 10 December 2014, after 15 goalless appearances.

On 5 January 2015, Poulson joined Kabuscorp S.C.P. in Angola. He spent the next two years also in the Girabola, with G.D. Interclube and G.D. Sagrada Esperança.

Poulson returned home on 9 June 2017, signing with second-tier F.C. Famalicão for a year. He recorded his best professional figures of five goals in that season, including two in a 3–2 home victory over C.D. Nacional on 4 February 2018.

References

External links

1989 births
Living people
People from Paredes, Portugal
Sportspeople from Porto District
Portuguese footballers
Association football forwards
Primeira Liga players
Liga Portugal 2 players
Segunda Divisão players
S.C. Espinho players
U.S.C. Paredes players
Varzim S.C. players
F.C. Paços de Ferreira players
C.D. Aves players
F.C. Famalicão players
Lusitânia F.C. players
SC São João de Ver players
Girabola players
Kabuscorp S.C.P. players
G.D. Interclube players
Portuguese expatriate footballers
Expatriate footballers in Angola
Portuguese expatriate sportspeople in Angola